Johann Friedrich Cotta (12 March 170131 December 1779) was a German Lutheran theologian.

Biography
He was the son of Johann Georg Cotta, who was in turn the son of Johann Georg Cotta, the founder of the publishing house J. G. Cotta. After studying theology at the University of Tübingen, Johann Friedrich began his public career as lecturer at the University of Jena. He then traveled through Germany, France and the Netherlands, and, after residing several years in London, became professor at Tübingen in 1733.

In 1736, he moved to the University of Göttingen to become the chair of theology there.  George II of Great Britain, in his capacity as elector of Hanover, had founded the university at Göttingen two years before. In 1739, however, Cotta returned, as extraordinary professor of theology, to his Alma Mater, Tübingen, and, after successively filling the chairs of history, poetry and oratory, was appointed ordinary professor of theology there in 1741. He died as chancellor of Tübingen.

His learning was at once wide and accurate; his theological views were orthodox, although he did not believe in strict verbal inspiration.

Works
He was a voluminous writer. His chief works are:

 Johann Gerhard, Loci Theologici, as editor (1762–1777)
 Kirchenhistorie des Neuen Testaments, as author (1768–1773)

Family
His grand nephew was the publisher of the same name, Johann Friedrich Cotta, who devoted J. G. Cotta to the publication of many noted German authors, such as Johann von Goethe and Friedrich Schiller.

Notes

1701 births
1779 deaths
German Lutheran theologians
18th-century German Protestant theologians
University of Tübingen alumni
Academic staff of the University of Tübingen
Academic staff of the University of Göttingen
German male non-fiction writers
18th-century German male writers